Ellon Castle is a scheduled monument within the town of Ellon, Aberdeenshire. Only ruins survive of the 16th-century structure that may incorporate sections from the 15th century together with 18th-century renovations. The ruins form a focal point in a formal  garden planted in 1745; an older Category A listed sundial dating from c. 1700 forms the centrepiece to the garden.

History
Motte Castle

A timbered motte castle existed on a different site in Ellon, which later became known as Moot Hill or Earl's Hill, dating back to the 13th-century rule of the Comyns. One of the principal seats of the Mormaers who controlled Buchan, the motte was used by Alexander Comyn as the prime centre to carry out legal affairs. Surrounded by a deep ditch, the level hill of earth was topped by a wooden tower containing accommodation for the family. A drawbridge prevented intruders gaining access to the timber staircase on the side of the slope leading to the palisade around the tower. Barns, stables and other ancillary structures were housed in another courtyard alongside it that incorporated the same protection measures. After Robert the Bruce defeated Comyn's son, John, at the Battle of Barra on 24 December 1307, there followed the Harrying of Buchan and Ellon was destroyed by fire; the earthen mound survived until it was flattened at the start of the 19th century. The downfall of the Comyns saw the ownership of the lands returned to the Crown which held them until gifted to Alexander Stewart, Earl of Buchan by Robert II of Scotland.

Old Castle

Land known as the Hill of Ardgith was sold by Isobel Moffat to Thomas Kennedy in 1413. Kennedy – sometimes spelt as Kynidy – had been appointed as hereditary Constable of Aberdeen by the Duke of Albany in appreciation for his actions during the Battle of Harlaw. A fortification was constructed at some point after the purchase date of the land and before 1500; originally known as the Fortalice of Ardgith, the castle was likely built by the Kennedy of Kermuck – sometimes recorded as Kinmuck – family and was used as their family seat. According to the archaeology historian W. Douglas Simpson the basement vault dates to the 15th century and pre-dates any later remains. The castle was reconstructed in the late 16th century that, according to Simpson, was undertaken by the masons John and Thomas Leiper, who were also responsible for work at nearby Tolquhon Castle, the House of Schivas and Castle Fraser.

A stone bearing the Kennedy arms is set into the ruins. Dated 1635, the marriage stone pictures a shield and bears the initials G. K.

Later history

In 1706 the site was acquired by Baillie James Gordon, who sold it in 1752 to the Earl Of Aberdeen. He extended the castle to a U-shaped plan and allowed one of his mistresses to live there with their son Alexander. The castle was later demolished and replaced by a mansion house, itself demolished in 1927. Today only the stable block bears the name.

Garden
The centrepiece of the  formal garden is a facet head sundial. Dating from c. 1700, it is mounted on three steps and features twenty-four faces. It may have been erected as a memorial to Baillie Gordon of Ellon's two children who were murdered by their tutor, Robert Irvine, in 1717. The two boys were killed in Edinburgh after they reported seeing him with their mother's servant in a compromising situation.

References

Notes

Citations

Bibliography

Ruined castles in Aberdeenshire
Scheduled Ancient Monuments in Aberdeenshire
Clan Comyn